De Sensatie van de Toekomst (1931) is a Dutch film directed by Dimitri Buchowetzki and Jack Salvatori, released by Paramount Pictures, and based on the play Television by Howard Irving Young (1893-1952).

This film was also released by Paramount in French (Magie moderne), Italian (Televisione), Swedish (Trådlöst och kärleksfullt), Polish (Świat bez granic), Czech (Svet bez hranic), and Romanian (Televiziune) versions.

Cast
Dolly Bouwmeester		
Roland Varno		
Marie van Westerhoven		
Charles Braakensiek		
Johan Boskamp			
Hans Braakensiek		
Jack Salvatori

See also
Dutch films of the 1930s

External links 
 

1931 films
Dutch black-and-white films
Dutch films based on plays
Films directed by Dimitri Buchowetzki
1930s Dutch-language films
1930s French-language films
1930s Italian-language films
1930s Swedish-language films
1930s Polish-language films
1930s Czech-language films
Romanian-language films
Dutch multilingual films
1931 comedy films
Dutch comedy films
1931 multilingual films